Kata is a martial arts term referring to a pattern of defense-and-attack.

Kata may also refer to:

People
 Kata (name)
 Kata people or Katirs, alternative name for a tribal group of Afghanistan
 Katariina Souri (born 1968), Finnish author, artist, columnist, and a Playboy Playmate of the Month
 Kata, daughter of George I of Georgia, Georgian royal princess of the 11th century
 Kata of Georgia, Georgian royal princess of the 12th century
 Solomone Kata, Tongan rugby league player

Places
Kata, Burma, a town
Kata, Estonia, a village
Kata, Iran, a village
Kata, Myanmar, a village
Kata, Tibet, a village

Other uses
 Kata (programming), exercises in programming which help hone skills through practice and repetition
Kata (mathematics), a name proposed for a direction in a fourth spatial dimension
 KATA (AM), a California radio station
 KATA-CD, a Dallas, TX, television station
 Kata Station, a train station in Owase, Japan
 Katakana, a character set in the Japanese writing language
 Ovine rinderpest, or kata, a contagious disease of sheep, goats, and other animals
 Kata, a Grenada drum

See also
 Katar (disambiguation)
 Katha (disambiguation)
 Katta (disambiguation)
 Khata, a Tibetan ceremonial scarf

he:קאטה
ja:型